Camille Alfred Pabst (June 18, 1828 – September 30, 1898) was a French  painter.

After studying law in Strasbourg, he was at first a lawyer in Colmar, but left the bar to devote himself to painting. He trained with Pierre-Charles Comte in Paris and first exhibited at the Salon of 1865.

Considered a "painter of Alsace Folklore", Pabst painted the landscape of his native region, but also produced historical scenes and scenes of everyday life.

He is buried in the Colombarium of the Père-Lachaise cemetery in Paris.

Gallery

References 

Article incorporates text from the equivalent article in French Wikipedia

External links 

19th-century French painters
1828 births
1898 deaths